Tak Taku (also Romanized as Tak Takū) is a village in Shahid Modarres Rural District, in the Central District of Shushtar County, Khuzestan Province, Iran. At the 2006 census, its population was 677, in 123 families.

References 

Populated places in Shushtar County